Oregon Route 173 is an Oregon state highway running from Timberline Lodge in Clackamas County to U.S. Route 26 near Government Camp. OR 173 is known as the Timberline Highway No. 173 (see Oregon highways and routes).

OR 173 was established in 2002 as part of Oregon's project to assign route numbers to highways that previously were not assigned, and, as of September 2010, was unsigned.

Route description 

OR 173 begins at Timberline Lodge.  It heads south and then west down Mount Hood to an intersection with US 26 approximately one mile east of Government Camp, where it ends.

History 

OR 173 was assigned to the Timberline Highway in 2002.

Major intersections

Related routes 
 U.S. Route 26

References 
 Oregon Department of Transportation, Descriptions of US and Oregon Routes, https://web.archive.org/web/20051102084300/http://www.oregon.gov/ODOT/HWY/TRAFFIC/TEOS_Publications/PDF/Descriptions_of_US_and_Oregon_Routes.pdf, page 27.
 Oregon Department of Transportation, Timberline Highway No. 173, ftp://ftp.odot.state.or.us/tdb/trandata/maps/slchart_pdfs_1980_to_2002/Hwy173_1997.pdf

173
Transportation in Clackamas County, Oregon
Mount Hood National Forest